WASP-43 is a K-type star in the Sextans constellation. It is about half the size of the Sun, and has approximately half the mass. WASP-43 has one known planet in orbit, a Hot Jupiter called WASP-43b. At the time of publishing of WASP-43b's discovery on April 15, 2011, the planet was the most closely orbiting Hot Jupiter discovered. The small orbit of WASP-43b is thought to be caused by WASP-43's unusually low mass. WASP-43 was first observed between January and May 2009 by the SuperWASP project, and was found to be cooler and slightly richer in metals than the Sun. WASP-43 has also been found to be an active star that rotates at a high velocity.

Observational history
WASP-43 was first observed by the WASP-South part of the planet-searching SuperWASP project between January and May 2009. It was determined from the collected data that WASP-43 could potentially host a planet that transited, or crossed in front of, its host star as seen from Earth. Later observations by both the WASP-South and SuperWASP-North sections of SuperWASP between January and May 2010 yielded a total of 13,768 data points.

Scientists interpreted that a 0.81-day orbit of a possible planet from the data, and followed up with observations using the CORALIE spectrograph on the Leonhard Euler Telescope at Chile's La Silla Observatory. CORALIE provided radial velocity measurements that indicated that WASP-43 was being transited by a planet that was 1.8 times Jupiter's mass, now dubbed WASP-43b. Another follow-up using the TRAPPIST telescope further defined the light curve of the body transiting WASP-43.

WASP-43b's discovery was reported on April 15, 2011 in the journal Astronomy and Astrophysics.

Characteristics
WASP-43 is a K-type star with a mass that is 0.58 times that of the Sun, and a radius that is 0.93 times that of the Sun. In other words, WASP-43 is far less massive than the Sun, but is approximately the same size. With an effective temperature of 4400 K, WASP-43 is cooler than the Sun. It also has slightly lower quantities of iron than the Sun, with a measured metallicity of [Fe/H] = -0.05 (89% of that measured in the Sun). However, in general, the star has a slightly larger quantity of metals than the Sun. A notable exception is lithium, which is not present in WASP-43's spectrum. However, the star's spectrum also indicates that WASP-43 is an active star. WASP-43 has been found to rotate quickly, although the exact mechanism that causes such speed in this rotation is uncertain, it may be possible that this is caused by tidal interactions between WASP-43 and its planet.

With an apparent magnitude of 12.4, WASP-43 cannot be seen with the unaided eye. The star is located approximately 80 parsecs (260 light years) away from Earth.

Planetary system
WASP-43b is a Hot Jupiter with a mass that is 1.78 times the mass of Jupiter and a radius that is 0.93 times Jupiter's radius. WASP-43b orbits its host star every 0.813475 days (19.5234 hours) at a distance of 0.0142 AU, the closest orbit yet found at the time of WASP-43b's discovery. WASP-43's unusually low mass accounts for WASP-43b's small orbit. Because planets with orbits around stars like WASP-43 are not usually observed, models either suggest that planets like WASP-43b are either uncommon or have short lifetimes caused by a decay in their orbits. WASP-43b has a density of 2.20 g/cm3

In August 2022, this planetary system was included among 20 systems to be named by the third NameExoWorlds project.

References

Planetary systems with one confirmed planet
Sextans (constellation)
Planetary transit variables
K-type main-sequence stars
J10193800-0948225